The fourth season of Ghost Whisperer, an American television series created by John Gray, commenced airing in the United States on October 3, 2008, concluded May 15, 2009, and consisted of 23 episodes. The series follows the life of Melinda Gordon (Jennifer Love Hewitt), who has the ability to see and communicate with ghosts. While trying to live as normal a life as possible—she is married and owns an antique store—Melinda helps earthbound spirits resolve their problems and cross over into the Light, or the spirit world. Her tasks are difficult and at times she struggles with people who push her away and disbelieve her ability. In addition, the ghosts are mysterious and sometimes menacing in the beginning and Melinda must use the clues available to her to understand the spirit's needs and help them.

Ghost Whisperer'''s fourth season aired in the United States (U.S.) on Fridays at 8:00 pm ET on CBS, a terrestrial television network, where it received an average of 10.62 million viewers per episode, becoming the most watched season of the series. 
 Plot 
In the fourth season, Melinda meets Eli James (Jamie Kennedy) after a fire at Rockland University who, after his own near-death experience, develops the ability to hear ghosts. Melinda says goodbye to her close friend Rick Payne, who leaves Grandview on a research trip for the university. In this season, Jim is shot and killed. He does not "cross over" because he does not want to leave Melinda, and his spirit later enters the body of a man named Sam Lucas, who died in an unrelated accident in Grandview and crossed over. When Jim/Sam regains consciousness, he has no memory of being Jim. Melinda works to get him to remember his past life and her, and succeeds after much difficulty and skepticism on the part of her friends. They soon discover that Melinda is pregnant and that the date of conception was right before Jim died.

At the end of the season, Ned and Eli find the Book of Changes, a book written by the Watchers (a benevolent group of ghosts who keep watch over the living). The book tells them of past and future prominent dates, such as Andrea and Jim's deaths. One date is listed as September 25, 2009; Melinda's due date. Melinda learns from a Watcher named Carl that her child is destined to not only inherit her gift, but be far more powerful than her. Melinda and Jim decide to remarry and have a small ceremony on a snowy night, on the street where they first met.

 Development Ghost Whisperer is based on the work of "Spirit Communicator" James Van Praagh, who is co-executive producer and regularly updates a blog about the show through LivingTV. The stories are also said to be based in part on the work of "Spirit Communicator" Mary Ann Winkowski. Development of the show dates back to at least two years before its premiere.

The show was produced by Sander/Moses Productions in association with CBS Television Studios (originally Paramount Network Television in season one and ABC Studios (originally Touchstone Television in the first two seasons) and CBS Paramount Network Television in seasons two and three).

The show was filmed on the Universal Studios back lot in Los Angeles. One area on the lot is Courthouse Square from the Back to the Future trilogy, though it has been drastically modified to depict Grandview. For example, the clock tower in Back to the Future'' has been completely covered up. Cast and crew members believe that the set gets visits from real spirits.

Sound effects were completed at Smart Post Sound. Visual effects for the pilot and some season one episodes were completed at Flash Film Works. Visual effects for nearly the entire series were created at Eden FX.

Creator John Gray grew up in Brooklyn, New York, which is not far from Grandview-On-Hudson, west of the Hudson River. Piermont is often referenced in episodes as the neighboring town, which is accurate to real life as Grandview-On-Hudson is actually located just north of Piermont. Professor Rick Payne worked in the fictional "Rockland University," and perhaps not coincidentally, the actual Grandview, New York is a village located in Rockland County, New York.

Cast 

 Jennifer Love Hewitt as Melinda Gordon (23 episodes)
 David Conrad as Jim Clancy/Sam Lucas (23 episodes)
 Camryn Manheim as Delia Banks (23 episodes)
 Jay Mohr as Rick Payne (1 episode)
 Christoph Sanders as Ned Banks (13 episodes)
 Jamie Kennedy as Eli James (23 episodes)

Episodes

References 

General references 
 
 
 

2009 American television seasons
2008 American television seasons
4